Petar Zdravkovski – Penko (November 4, 1912, Prilep, Ottoman Empire – July 26, 1967 Beirut, Lebanon) – educator, statesman, diplomat.

Biography 
Petar Zdravkovski - Penko was born on November 4, 1912 in Prilep, Ottoman Empire. He graduated from the Teachers College in Belgrade, Yugoslavia, where he became involved in the students' and workers' Socialist movement. After graduation he worked as a teacher in the villages of Grnčarevo and Podmočani near Resen.

He joined the Communist Party of Yugoslavia (CPY) and after the Bulgarian fascist occupation he took part in the preparations for the armed resistance in Prilep. He was jailed and after a long interrogation he was interned in Bulgaria. In the spring of 1943 he returned to Macedonia, and in the autumn of the same year he joined the armed partisan forces in Debarca.

After the Second World War he was appointed to various political functions: teacher at the Party High School in Skopje, Chief of the Press Department of the Government of the People’s Republic of Macedonia (PRM); head of Radio Skopje (1947-1949); Secretary General of the PRM Government (1949-1950), member of the Executive Council of PRM; Minister of the Council of Education (1957-1962); Minister of the Council for Science; member of the Parliament of the Socialist Republic of Macedonia Central Committee. As Minister of Education, he was President of the Council of the University in Skopje.

Diplomatic career 
He was fluent in French and had a working knowledge of English, Russian and Turkish. He started his diplomatic career as a minister plenipotentiary (rank of ambassador) to the Yugoslav diplomatic mission in Helsinki, Finland (1950-1953). He was appointed chief of staff of the Department for Foreign Affairs in Belgrade (1953-1954) and consul general of Yugoslavia to Marseilles, France (1954-1957). In 1965 he was appointed ambassador of Yugoslavia to Beirut, Lebanon (also accredited to Jordan), where after a short illness he died in 1967.

He was buried with high state honors in the Alley for Distinguished Citizens in the Butel cemetery in Skopje.

Decorations 
He was awarded many national and international decorations:

In the Butel municipality in Skopje an elementary school bears his name.

See also

 Legion of Honour
 List of Legion of Honour recipients by name (Z)
 Legion of Honour Museum

References

Further reading 

1912 births
1967 deaths
Yugoslav educators
Yugoslav Partisans members
Yugoslav diplomats
People from Prilep
Recipients of the Order of the Lion of Finland